Etisalat by e& is a rapid transit station on the Green Line of the Dubai Metro in Dubai, UAE.

Trial running began in October 2010, with the station inaugurated on 9 September 2011 and opened to the public the next day, 10 September 2011.

On February 5, 2023, this station was renamed to "Etisalat by e&".

The station is located on Al Nahda Street, between Al Qusais and Al Twar, and north of Dubai International Airport. It is close to Al Qusais Pond Park. It is also close to the junction of Al Nahda Street with the major Sheikh Mohammed Bin Zayed Road (E 311).

The station continues to the network's depot.

Platform layout

References

External links
 RTA DUBAI METRO GREEN LINE: Train ride tour from Etisalat to Creek Metro Station POV 4K 2020 on YouTube

Railway stations in the United Arab Emirates opened in 2011
Dubai Metro stations
Etisalat